The following is a list of consorts of the Kingdom of the Two Sicilies.

Queen consort of the Two Sicilies

House of Bonaparte (Edict of Bayonne), 1806–1815

Joachim Murat was the first king to rule a kingdom which was called "Two Sicilies" by the Edict of Bayonne, in 1808, though he controlled the mainland, he never physically controlled the island of Sicily which his Bourbon rival had fled from Naples to. After the Congress of Vienna, the title king of Two Sicilies was adopted by Ferdinand IV of Naples, in 1816.<ref> Romeo R., Momenti e problemi della Restaurazione nel Regno delle Due Sicilie (1815-1820), in «Mezzogiorno e Sicilia nel Risorgimento», Napoli 1963, pp 85-96</ref> Under Ferdinand the Kingdom of Naples and the Kingdom of Sicily were unified, he had previously been king of both Naples and Sicily.

 House of Bourbon, 1815–1861In 1861 Two Sicilies became part of the newly founded Kingdom of Italy

Spouse of the Head of the Royal House of the Two Sicilies, 1861–1960

In 1960 headship of the House of Bourbon-Two Sicilies became disputed by two different Bourbon lines.

Heads of the Royal House of the Two Sicilies, disputed 1960–present

Spanish line claim, 1960–present

French line claim, 1960–present

See also
List of monarchs of the Two Sicilies
Prince of Bourbon-Two Sicilies
Princess of Bourbon-Two Sicilies
Princess of Bourbon-Two Sicilies by marriage
Duchess of Calabria 
List of Neapolitan consorts 
List of Sicilian consorts 
List of Italian consorts
List of Sardinian consorts
Royal Consorts of Spain
List of Tuscan consorts

References

External links

 
 
Two Sicilies
Sicilies
Two Sicilies